Vladimir Valerevich Yastrebchak (born 9 October 1979) was the Minister of Foreign Affairs of Transnistria. He replaced the longtime minister Valeriy Anatolievich Litskai on July 1, 2008. He was replaced in January 2012 by Nina Shtanski.

Yastrebchak was born in Tiraspol, and graduated from the law school of the T. G. Shevchenko University in 2001, after which he joined the Ministry of Foreign Affairs. He became the First Deputy Minister there on February 14, 2007.

He speaks a number of languages fluently including English and French.

Yastrebchak is of Ukrainian descent and is married.

References

External links
 Ministry of Foreign Affairs (official website)

1979 births
Living people
People from Tiraspol
Transnistrian people of Ukrainian descent
Transnistrian politicians
Foreign ministers of Transnistria
Recipients of the Order of Friendship (South Ossetia)